Hit the Road Jack is a British comedy television series. It is shown on Channel 4 and features Jack Whitehall touring the UK, performing stand-up comedy. Each episode is about 24 minutes long.

Episode list

References

External links
 
 

2010s British comedy television series
2012 British television series debuts
2012 British television series endings
Channel 4 comedy
British stand-up comedy television series
English-language television shows